The Swiss Diamond Hotel Prishtina is a luxury five star Hotel in Pristina, Kosovo. It is located on Sheshi Nëna Terezë, the main boulevard in the central district of the city.

The Hotel is internationally awarded with the International Star Diamond Award from the American Academy of Hospitality Sciences for its luxurious ambiance and the personalized services offered.

History
The Swiss Diamond Hotel opened on December 1, in 2011, after renovating the old existing hotel Iliria. The Iliria was privatized on 2006 by Mabetex and Union Commerce, with Albanian businessman Behgjet Pacolli as main shareholder.

Gallery

Notes and references
Notes:

References:

External links
 Official Website

Tourism in Kosovo
Buildings and structures in Pristina
Hotels in Kosovo
Hotels established in 2011